Bartherans is a commune in the Doubs department in the Bourgogne-Franche-Comté region in eastern France.

Geography
Bartherans is situated at 455 m of altitude approximately 23 km southwest of Besançon in a wooded valley.

Neighbouring communities are Montfort in the north, Échay and Myon in the east, Ivrey in the south, and Ronchaux in the west.

History
Gaspard Grandjean from the village founded a chapel devoted to Saint-Antoine and Hubert in 1586. The ruins of the crypt can still be seen in the cemetery.

Population

Sights
There is a seventeenth-century manor house Mouret de Châtillon which is called le château, although it is not as grand as that name implies.

The 19th-century church boasts a bronze bell.

See also 
 Communes of the Doubs department

References

Communes of Doubs